Uysal is a Turkish surname. Notable people with the surname include:

 Mevlüt Uysal (born 1966), Turkish lawyer and politician. Mayor of Istanbul.
 Necip Uysal (born 1991), Turkish footballer
 Soner Uysal (born 1977), Turkish footballer
 Vedat Uysal (born 1962), Turkish footballer
Halil Uysal (1973-April 2006) Kurdish Journalist and Film Producer 

Turkish-language surnames